Megachile esakii is a species of bee in the family Megachilidae. It was described by Yasumatsu in 1935.

References

Esakii
Insects described in 1935